Khanahr (Hindi: खनाहर) is a small village in Himachal Pradesh, India. The village is situated on the mountain slopes on the right bank of Kataula-ka-khad, a tributary of the Uhl River. The sub-village of Salgi is located on the main road. The North Campus of IIT Mandi borders Salgi and the entrance to the campus branches off from MDR23 at Salgi.

Description

The population as of the 2011 Census was 523 with 104 households.  The languages are Mandyali and Hindi.  Khanahr is a village in the Kamand Gram Panchayat.  Khanahr village includes the following sub-villages: Chowkidhar, Kayali, Dwardu, Panjaut, Khada Gehar and Salgi.

EWOK, a registered society started by IIT Mandi to cater to the education, training and entrepreneurial needs of rural women, has its office in Salgi.  A number of businesses incubated by EWOK are based in Salgi.

Education
A government primary school below MDR23 caters to children from surrounding villages.  The nearest government high school is in Kamand village  distance.  The IIT Mandi Mindtree School adjacent to Salgi caters to the IIT community and to children from villages of Kamand valley and Mandi town.  IIT Mandi is an institute of national importance offering bachelors, masters and PhD in engineering, and masters and PhD in sciences and humanities.  Students come from all parts of India and from some foreign countries.  The North Campus of IIT Mandi borders Khanahr/Salgi.

Transport
Public and private buses and private vans ply regularly between Mandi and various villages in the Kamand valley, passing through Salgi.  A few buses pass through en route from Mandi to Bajaura and Kullu.

Gallery

See also
 IIT Mandi
 EWOK

References

Villages in Mandi district